The Saginaw Valley Journal is the campus newspaper of Saginaw Valley State University (SVSU)  in University Center, Michigan. It is one of the few for-profit campus newspapers in the United States. 

The Journal is free for readers and is supported by advertisers only. It is distributed on the SVSU campus and in the surrounding community.  The Journal publishes in print monthly during the fall and winter semesters at SVSU.

The Journal was first published on March 18, 2009. In 2013, it was purchased by Blackhurst Campbell LLC shortly before the company changed its name to The Saginaw Valley Journal Limited Liability Company.

References

External links 
 

Student newspapers published in Michigan
Publications established in 2009
Saginaw Valley State University
2009 establishments in Michigan